Apodichthyinae is a subfamily of marine ray-finned fish belonging to the family Pholidae, the gunnels. These fishes are found in the North Pacific Ocean.

Genera
The subfamily contains 3 genera with a total of 4 species:

References

Pholidae
 
Taxa named by Carl Leavitt Hubbs
Taxa described in 1927
Ray-finned fish subfamilies